Oluwatoyin Sanni or Toyin Sanni is an African investment banker, lawyer, chartered secretary, stockbroker, and author. In June 2018, she resigned from United Capital. where she was Group CEO for over four years and in July 2018, she became the CEO of Emerging Africa Capital

Early life and education
Sanni was born in 1965 into a family of seven children. Her father was an accountant and her mother was in business. She has a strong Christian faith. She attended Queen's School, Ibadan then received a law degree from the University of Ife at the age of 18 (in 1984) after which she bagged a BL from the Nigerian Law School, Lagos. She later attended the University of Lagos where she got her master's degree. Sanni attended Harvard Business School Executive Education, Lagos Business School, Pan-Atlantic University CEO Program and IESE Business School Chief Executive Program.

Awards 
2017 was a good year for Toyin. Firstly ,she won the All African Business Woman of the year, West-Africa and later won the All African Business Woman of the year, Africa in the same year. The award was by CNBC Africa's AABLA awards in conjunction with Forbes Africa.  Toyin won the Pearl Awards CEO of the Yearaward, making her the first woman to win it in the 22-year history of the award.

The Pearl Awards are given to Nigeria's leading companies and Sanni's company took five awards including the top award of "The Pearl" - Overall Best Company. The other four awards won were, CEO of the year, Corporate Governance award, Highest Dividend Yield and Sector award for Non-bank Financial services company.

Also in 2017 her daughter (Oluwatoni Sanni) graduated with a first class from the University of Bristol.

Her other awards include BusinessDay NSE Top 25 CEO Award British Award for African Development- BRAAD Award, HEIRS Person of the Year 2015, Women4Africa Award, Fellow, Chartered Institute of Stockbrokers, FCS amongst others.

Roles
Sanni sits on the board of EAC Advisory Limited, EAC Trustees Limited, Emerging Africa Asset Management Limited, Trancsorp Plc, PEARL Awards and NEPAD Business Group Nigeria. She is an adviser to the micro banking company Mamamoni the company founded by Nkem Okocha. Sanni is in 2020 Chief Executive Officer of Emerging Africa Capital. She was the founder in 2016 and chairperson of Women in Finance ng (WIFng), a not for profit organization focused on advocacy for Nigerian women in the finance sector.

Private life
Sanni got married when she was 25 and has three children with her husband.

References

External links
LinkedIn

1965 births
Living people
Nigerian chief executives
Nigerian women business executives
Yoruba women in business
Nigerian Christians
Nigerian corporate directors
University of Lagos alumni
Queen's School, Ibadan alumni
Obafemi Awolowo University alumni
Lagos Business School alumni
Harvard Business School alumni
Yoruba women lawyers
Nigerian Law School alumni
Nigerian women lawyers
Women chief executives
Women corporate directors